Sandra Nabweteme (born 1 November 1996) is an Ugandan footballer who plays as an attacker for FH on loan from Þór/KA and for the Uganda national team. She played college football for the Southwestern Oklahoma State University from 2016 to 2019 where she won multiple accolades. In 2015, she was named the FUFA Female Player of the Year.

Early life
Nabweteme was raised in Kampala. She started training football at the age of five and played with the local boys teams until she turned 14 years old. She was invited to the Kawempe Muslim where she continued to play football.

College career
Nabweteme played for Southwestern Oklahoma State University in the United States from 2016 to 2019 and graduated with a degree in Engineering Physics in November 2020.

Club career
Nabweteme played two seasons with Kawempe Muslim in the then Uganda top-tier FUFA Women Elite League. She led the league in goals scored both seasons, with 17 goals in 9 games in her first season and 23 goals in 14 games in her second, propelling Kawempe to the championship both times.

In March 2021, Nabweteme signed with Þór/KA of the Icelandic Úrvalsdeild kvenna. On 20 July 2021, she was loaned to 1. deild kvenna club FH for the rest of the season after having appeared in 7 league matches with Þór/KA, where she scored 3 goals.

International career
In 2019, Nabweteme played for the Uganda national team in the 2020 CAF Women's Olympic Qualifying Tournament.

International goals
Scores and results list Uganda goal tally first

Personal life
Nabweteme's mother, Angela Nabukeera, played for the Kampala United in the early 2000s.

Honours

Club
FUFA Women Elite League champion: 2015, 2016
GAC Tournament champions: 2017, 2019

Individual
FUFA Female Player of the Year: 2015
FUFA Women Elite League top goal scorer: 2015, 2016
GAC Tournament MVP: 2019
First Team All-GAC selection: 2016, 2017, 2018, 2019
GAC Freshman of the Year: 2016
GAC Offensive of the Year: 2019
GAC top goal scorer: 2019

References

External links 
 
 
</ref>

1996 births
Living people
Sportspeople from Kampala
Ugandan women's footballers
Women's association football forwards
Southwestern Oklahoma State Bulldogs women's soccer players
Þór/KA players
FH women's football players
Sandra Nabweteme
Uganda women's international footballers
Ugandan expatriate women's footballers
Ugandan expatriate sportspeople in the United States
Expatriate women's soccer players in the United States
Ugandan expatriate sportspeople in Iceland
Expatriate women's footballers in Iceland